Katherine Chi Tai (born March 18, 1974) is an American attorney serving as the 19th United States Trade Representative since March 18, 2021. The daughter of Taiwanese immigrants, she is the first Asian-American to serve in the position. A member of the Democratic Party, she previously served as the chief trade counsel for the United States House Committee on Ways and Means.

Early life and education 
Tai was born on March 18, 1974, in Connecticut. Tai grew up in Washington, D.C., where she attended Sidwell Friends School. Her parents, who are of waishengren descent, were born in China, grew up in Taiwan and later immigrated to the United States. Tai is fluent in Mandarin. In 1996, Tai graduated from Yale University (Pierson College) with a Bachelor of Arts degree in history. After her undergraduate education, she taught English at Sun Yat-sen University as a Yale-China Fellow for two years, from 1996 to 1998.  Tai went on to study at Harvard Law School, where she earned a Juris Doctor in 2001.

After law school, she worked for several law firms, including Powell Goldstein, Sidley Austin, Baker McKenzie, and Miller & Chevalier, and clerked for U.S. District Courts in Washington, D.C., and Maryland.

Trade policy career 
From 2007 to 2014, Tai served in the Trade Representative's Office of General Counsel, becoming chief counsel for China trade enforcement from 2011 until her departure. At the Office of General Counsel, she worked on trade cases at the World Trade Organization. In 2014, she became trade counsel for the House Ways and Means Committee. She was named chief trade counsel in 2017.

During Tai's tenure with the Committee on Ways and Means, she played a significant role in the House's negotiations with the Trump administration regarding the United States–Mexico–Canada Agreement (USMCA), advocating for stronger labor provisions. The Associated Press has described her as a "problem-solving pragmatist on trade policy".

Trade Representative (2021-present)

Nomination 
Tai was nominated by President-elect Joe Biden to serve as Trade Representative in December 2020. Tai has been described as both an "avowed progressive" and as a "consensus builder [who can] help bridge the Democratic Party's varying views on trade".

Hearings on Tai's nomination were held before the Senate Finance Committee on February 25, 2021. Tai was reported out of the committee by unanimous consent on March 3, 2021. The entire Senate confirmed her on March 17, 2021, in a 98–0 vote; Senators Bernie Sanders and Mazie Hirono were absent for the vote. She became the only member of Biden's cabinet to receive unanimous support.

Tenure 
Tai was sworn into office on March 18, 2021. In her service as Trade Representative, Tai holds the rank and style of 'Ambassador,' and is a member of the Cabinet of the United States. As Trade Representative, Tai was credited by some advocates for pushing the Biden Administration in favor of the TRIPS Waiver. In June 2021, Tai became the first Trade Representative to address the AFL–CIO in what was described as an effort to reset the USTR's relations with labor unions. As Trade Representative, Tai has been a co-chair of the Trade and Technology Council since its creation in 2021.

References

External links 

 

|-

1970s births
21st-century American women lawyers
21st-century American lawyers
American people of Taiwanese descent
Biden administration cabinet members
Chinese-American members of the Cabinet of the United States
Harvard Law School alumni
Lawyers from Washington, D.C.
Living people
Sidwell Friends School alumni
United States congressional aides
Women members of the Cabinet of the United States
Yale University alumni